Tennis at the 2021 Summer Deaflympics  was held in Caxias Do Sul, Brazil from 3 to 12 May 2022.

Medal summary

Medalists

References

External links
 Deaflympics 2021

2021 Summer Deaflympics
2022 in tennis
Tennis tournaments in Brazil